Kirloskarvadi is India's second oldest industrial township that developed around the Kirloskar Brothers Ltd factory in the Palus Sangli district, in Maharashtra state, India. It is the second oldest industrial township in India. On 10 March 2010, Kirloskarwadi celebrated 100 years of its establishment. Kirloskarwadi is a rapidly growing satellite suburb of Palus city. The famous holy place of God Datta Maharaj Audumbar is just 10 km away. While Sagareshwar picnic spot is around 8–10. The town has centric connectivity between Tasgaon-vita-palus-uran islampur-karad talukas.

History
The town of Kirloskarwadi was founded by Laxmanrao Kirloskar in 1910 when he started his factory, called Kirloskar Brothers Ltd, near the railway station that was at that time called Kundal Road. Laxmanrao Kirloskar had read about "industrial townships" in Europe and USA where the owners of industries had built communities for the employees. His dream was to  build his own industry and a community for the employees. The culmination of his dream is the town of Kirloskarwadi.  Balasaheb Pant Pratinidhi, the ruler of the Aundh Sansthan, one of the many Indian Princely States under the British rule in India before independence, donated the land to Laxmanrao Kirloskar to establish the factory and the town. The factory around which the town was built is still the flagship manufacturing plant of Kirloskar Brothers Ltd

During Indian independence struggle, some of the militant revolutionary fighters who went underground to escape arrest took refuge in Kirloskarwadi. The workers from the factory took part in protests and satyagraha against the British rule. Two workers from the factory—Umashankar Pandya and Sadashiv Pendharkar—were killed when police opened fire on one such protest. An obelisk and park in the town commemorate the sacrifices of these workers.

Geography
Kirloskarvadi is located in the Krishna river valley. Sangli Palus, Satara, Pune and Kolhapur are the nearest cities.

INDUSTRIES AND NEAREST MIDC 
Kirloskarvadi is founded in 1910 by laxmanrao kirloskar in palus taluka. Kirloskarvadi has biggest industrial hub and it is only 4.3km from palus . There are many types of foundries and industries are located in kirloskarvadi. Nearest midc like palus midc and (kupwad) sangli midc. Company like kirloskar group is situated in kirloskarvadi it is very fast growing and developed area in palus

Transportation 

The Kirloskarvadi railway station (KOV) is one of the important station on the Mumbai–Bangalore railway line managed by Central Railway, Pune division. This place is projected as Commercial Capital of South Maharashtra by Shri. Suresh Prabhu, Commerce Minister - Govt.of India. Currently double line electrification is in construction between Pune-Miraj-Kolhapur and expected to be start first electric run trials from March 2019. There are trains to major cities like Delhi, Pune, Mumbai, Bangalore, Ahmedabad. Trains having stoppage here are - Goa Express, Gandhidham Express, Mysore Ajmer Express, Ajmer Garib Nawaz, LTT Hubli Express, Jodhpur Express, Bhagat ke Kothi Express, Sahyadri Express, Mahalaxmi Express, Maharashtra Express. There is long time demand to have a halt for Chalukya Express and Ernakulum Express to Kirloskarwadi station as it will give good service to Vita, Islampur, Palus and Tasgaon Taluka residing Passengers. There are Maharashtra State Road Transport Corporation (MSRTC) buses and private buses from Kirloskarwadi to Sangli, Kolhapur, Pune and Mumbai. There is also a private airport for Business Jets and a helipad for helicopters. Located in kirloskarwadi

References

External links

Kirloskarwadi in Sangli District Gazetteers Department
Kirloskar Brothers Limited

Cities and towns in Sangli district
Economy of Maharashtra
Kirloskar Group
1910 establishments in India
Company towns in India